Tampico is an unincorporated community in Grassy Fork Township, Jackson County, Indiana.

History
Tampico first grew around a blacksmith shop established in about 1840. The community was likely named after Tampico, in Mexico. A post office was established at Tampico in 1852, and remained in operation until it was discontinued in 1909.

Geography

References

Unincorporated communities in Jackson County, Indiana
Unincorporated communities in Indiana